German submarine U-578 was a Type VIIC U-boat of Nazi Germany's Kriegsmarine during World War II.

She was posted missing in the Bay of Biscay since 6 August 1942, with no explanation for her loss.

Design
German Type VIIC submarines were preceded by the shorter Type VIIB submarines. U-578 had a displacement of  when at the surface and  while submerged. She had two shafts and two  propellers.

U-578 was fitted with five  torpedo tubes (four fitted at the bow and one at the stern), fourteen torpedoes, one  SK C/35 naval gun, 220 rounds, and a  C/30 anti-aircraft gun. The boat had a complement of between forty-four and sixty.

Service history
The submarine was laid down on 1 August 1940 at Blohm & Voss, Hamburg as yard number 554, launched on 15 May 1941 and commissioned on 10 July under the command of Fregattenkapitän Ernst-August Rehwinkel.

She served with the 5th U-boat Flotilla from 10 July 1941 and the 7th U-boat Flotilla for training from 1 September. She stayed with the latter organization for operations until her loss, from 1 October 1941 until 6 August 1942.

First and second patrols
U-432s first patrol was from Kirkenes in Norway, she was rammed by a Soviet escort on 25 November 1941 off the Kola Peninsula; damage was slight. She arrived back at Kirkenes on the 27th.

She then headed for the Atlantic Ocean via the gap separating the Faroe and Shetland Islands. She arrived at St. Nazaire in occupied France, on 28 January 1942.

Third patrol

The next day she sank the American destroyer . The 'four-stacker', completed in October 1919, was the first warship to be lost to enemy action in US waters.

On the return leg toward France, she sank the in-ballast Ingerto on 12 March 1942 in mid-Atlantic. She docked at St. Nazaire on the 25th.

Fourth patrol
Patrol number four was the boat's longest (58 days), but in terms of tonnage sunk, her most successful. She also sank Berganger on 2 June southeast of Cape Cod.

Fifth patrol and loss
The boat set out from St. Nazaire for the last time on 6 August 1942. She was posted missing in the Bay of Biscay from that date, with no explanation for her loss.

Forty-nine men died with U-578; there were no survivors.

Previously recorded fate
Sunk on 10 August 1942 in the Bay of Biscay by depth charges from a Czechoslovak aircraft of No. 311 Squadron RAF. Damage was minor.

Summary of raiding history

References

Notes

Citations

Bibliography

External links

German Type VIIC submarines
U-boats commissioned in 1941
U-boats sunk in 1942
Missing U-boats of World War II
U-boats sunk by unknown causes
1941 ships
Ships built in Hamburg
Ships lost with all hands
World War II submarines of Germany
Maritime incidents in August 1942